Helen Gordon Davis (December 25, 1926 – May 18, 2015) was an American drama teacher, actress, and politician. Born in Brooklyn, New York, Davis received her bachelor's degree in theatre from Brooklyn College. In 1948, Davis and her husband Gene Davis moved to Tampa, Florida. Davis taught high school drama and acted in community theatre. In 1975, Davis served in the Florida House of Representatives as a Democrat and then served in the Florida State Senate from 1989 until 1993.

References

1926 births
2015 deaths
Politicians from Brooklyn
Politicians from Tampa, Florida
Brooklyn College alumni
Actresses from Florida
Educators from Florida
Women state legislators in Florida
Democratic Party members of the Florida House of Representatives
Democratic Party Florida state senators
Educators from New York City
American women educators
21st-century American women